Alla Kudryavtseva and Katarina Srebotnik were the defending champions, but Kudryavtseva chose not to participate. Srebotnik played alongside Raquel Atawo, but lost in the quarterfinals to Irina Khromacheva and Veronika Kudermetova. 

Anna-Lena Grönefeld and Alicja Rosolska won the title, defeating Khromacheva and Kudermetova in the final, 7–6(9–7), 6–2

Seeds

Draw

Draw

External links 
 Main draw

Volvo Car Open - Doubles
Charleston Open